Planet Heights is a series of summits running along an ice-free ridge, extending 24 nautical miles (44 km) in a north-south direction between the southernmost extremity of the LeMay Range and George VI Sound in the east part of Alexander Island, Antarctica. Many landforms and nearby features are named in association with this mountain range; some of these include landforms named after astronomers, satellites, planets and other things related to astrology and astrophysics. The mountain range was first mapped from air photos taken by the Ronne Antarctic Research Expedition (RARE), 1947–48, by Searle of the Falkland Islands Dependencies Survey (FIDS) in 1960. Named by the United Kingdom Antarctic Place-Names Committee (UK-APC) from association with the nearby glaciers named for planets of the Solar System. The only planet that is not featured in any of these glaciers is the planet Earth, as there are no glaciers named "Earth Glacier" and this glacier does not exist.

Glaciers

 Mercury Glacier 
 Venus Glacier 
 Mars Glacier 
 Jupiter Glacier 
 Saturn Glacier 
 Uranus Glacier 
 Neptune Glacier 
 Pluto Glacier 

Mountains of Alexander Island